Ludacris is a three-time Grammy Award-winning American rapper and actor from Atlanta, Georgia. He has released eight studio albums, all which have been released on the Def Jam Recordings record label: Back for the First Time (2000), Word of Mouf (2001), Chicken-n-Beer (2003), The Red Light District (2004), Release Therapy (2006), Theater of the Mind (2008),  Battle of the Sexes (2010) and Ludaversal (2015). His first five albums have all achieved multi-platinum status, and his next 2 albums achieved gold status. In addition, he has 4 albums that peaked at number one on the Billboard 200 charts.

Ludacris has received twenty Grammy Award nominations, and has won three: "Best Rap/Sung Collaboration" for the song "Yeah!" in 2005, and both "Best Rap Song" for "Money Maker" and "Best Rap Album" for the album Release Therapy in 2007. He has also received twelve nominations from the BET Awards, winning two: "Viewer's Choice" for "Yeah!" in 2004 and "Best Collaboration" for "Runaway Love" in 2007. Ludacris has also acted in several films; the Screen Actors Guild presented him the award for "Outstanding Cast in a Motion Picture" for his performance in the film Crash. Overall, Ludacris has received 12 awards from 41 nominations.

American Music Awards
The American Music Awards is an annual awards ceremony created by Dick Clark in 1973. Ludacris has received two nominations.

|-
|  || Word of Mouf || Favorite Album – R&B/Hip-Hop || 
|-
|  || Ludacris || Favorite Male Hip-Hop Artist ||

BET Awards

BET Awards
The BET Awards were established in 2001 by the Black Entertainment Television network. Ludacris has received nine awards from twelve nominations.

|-
| rowspan="2"| 2002 || "One Minute Man" || Video of the Year || 
|-
| Ludacris || Best Male Hip-Hop Artist || 
|-
| 2003 || "Gossip Folks" || Best Collaboration || 
|-
|rowspan="4"| 2004 ||rowspan="3"| "Yeah!" || Viewer's Choice || 
|-
| Best Collaboration || 
|-
| Video of the Year || 
|-
| Ludacris || Best Male Hip-Hop Artist || 
|-
| 2005 || Ludacris || Best Male Hip-Hop Artist || 
|-
| rowspan="2"| 2006 || "Unpredictable" || Best Collaboration || 
|-
| Ludacris || Best Actor || 
|-
| rowspan="2"| 2007 || Ludacris || Best Male Hip-Hop Artist || 
|-
| "Runaway Love" || Best Collaboration || 
|-
| rowspan="1"| 2008 || "I'm So Hood" || Best Collaboration || 
|-

BET Hip Hop Awards

|-
| rowspan="2"| 2008
| rowspan="2"|"I'm So Hood (Remix)" (with DJ Khaled, Young Jeezy, Busta Rhymes, Big Boi, Lil Wayne, Fat Joe, Birdman & Rick Ross)
| Best Hip Hop Video
| 
|-
| Best Hip Hop Collaboration
| 
|-
| 2010
| "All I Do Is Win" (with DJ Khaled, T-Pain, Ludacris, Rick Ross & Snoop Dogg)
| Best Club Banger
| 
|-
| 2011
| "Country Sh*t (Remix)" (with Big K.R.I.T. & Bun B)
| Reese's Perfect Combo Award
| 
|-
| 2012
| "Same Damn Time (Remix)"
| Sweet 16: Best Featured Verse
|

CMT Music Awards
The CMT Music Awards is an annual ceremony held in Nashville, Tennessee, dedicated exclusively to honor country music videos. It was established in 1967, and had several names throughout the years. In 2002, it was moved to Country Music Television and, in 2005, was renamed CMT Music Awards. Ludacris has received two nominations and one wins.

{| class="wikitable plainrowheaders" style="width:85%;"
|-
! scope="col" style="width:4%;"| Year
! scope="col" style="width:50%;"| Award
! scope="col" style="width:35%;"| Nominated work / Recipient
! scope="col" style="width:6%;"| Result
! scope="col" style="width:6%;"| 
|- align=center
|rowspan="4"|2018
|rowspan="3"|"The Champion" 
|Video of the Year 
|
|rowspan="4"|
|-
|Female Video of the Year 
|
|-
|Collaborative Video of the Year
|

Golden Raspberry Awards
The Golden Raspberry Awards (also known in short terms as Razzies and Razzie Awards) is a mock booby prize award in recognition of the worst in film.  Thus far, Ludacris has received one nomination (result pending).

|- align=center
|2019
|Show Dogs (voice only)
|Worst Supporting Actor
|

Grammy Awards
The Grammy Awards are awarded annually by the National Academy of Recording Arts and Sciences of the United States. Ludacris has received three awards from seventeen nominations.

|-
| rowspan="3"|  
|  "One Minute Man" (with Missy Elliott & Trina)
| Best Short-Form Music Video 
|  
|-
| "Area Codes" (featuring Nate Dogg)
| Best Rap/Sung Collaboration 
| 
|-
| Back for the First Time 
|rowspan="2"| Best Rap Album
|
|-
| rowspan="2"|  
| Word of Mouf
|
|-
| "Rollout (My Business)"
|rowspan="2"| Best Male Rap Solo Performance 
|
|-
| rowspan="3"|    
| "Stand Up"
|
|-
| "Act a Fool" 
| Best Song Written for a Motion Picture, Television or Other Visual Media 
| 
|-
| "Gossip Folks" (with Missy Elliott)
| Best Rap Performance by a Duo or Group 
| 
|-
| rowspan="3"|  
|rowspan="3"| "Yeah!" (with Usher & Lil Jon)
| Best Rap/Sung Collaboration 
| 
|-
| Best R&B Song 
| 
|-
| Record of the Year 
| 
|-
| 
|  "Number One Spot" 
| Best Rap Solo Performance 
|  
|-
| rowspan="4"|  
| "Money Maker" (featuring Pharrell)
| Best Rap Song 
| 
|-
| Release Therapy 
| Best Rap Album 
| 
|-
| "Unpredictable" (with Jamie Foxx)
| Best Rap/Sung Collaboration 
| 
|-
| "Georgia" (with Field Mob featuring Jamie Foxx)
| rowspan="3"| Best Rap Performance by a Duo or Group 
| 
|-
| rowspan="1"|  
| "Wish You Would" (featuring T.I.)
| 
|-
| rowspan="2"|  
| "My Chick Bad" (featuring Nicki Minaj)
| 
|-
| "How Low" 
| Best Rap Solo Performance 
| 
|-
| rowspan="1"|  
|"Tonight (Best You Ever Had)" (with John Legend) ||Best Rap/Sung Collaboration 
| 
|-

MTV Movie Awards
The MTV Movie Awards is an annual awards ceremony established in 1992 by the MTV television network. Ludacris has received one nomination.

|-
| 2004 || 2 Fast 2 Furious || Best Male Breakthrough Performance ||

MTV Video Music Awards
The MTV Video Music Awards is an annual awards ceremony established in 1984 by MTV. Ludacris has received one awards from six nominations.

|-
|rowspan="2"|  || "Saturday (Oooh Oooh!)" || Best Rap Video || 
|-
| "Area Codes" || Best Video from a Film || 
|-
|  || "Move" || Best Rap Video || 
|-
|  || "Stand Up" || Best Rap Video || 
|-
|rowspan="2"|  ||rowspan="2"| "Number One Spot" || Best Rap Video || 
|-
| Best Special Effects in a Video ||

Screen Actors Guild Awards
The Screen Actors Guild Awards is an annual awards ceremony established in 1995 by the Screen Actors Guild. Ludacris has received one award from two nominations.

|-
| rowspan="2" style="text-align:center;"| 2005 || Crash || rowspan="2"| Outstanding Performance by a Cast in a Motion Picture || 
|-
| Hustle & Flow ||

World Music Awards

|-
|rowspan="3"| 2014 ||rowspan="3"| Ludacris || World's Best Male Artist || 
|-
| World's Best Live Act || 
|-
| World's Best Entertainer of the Year ||

References

External links
 Official website

Ludacris
Ludacris